Souidania is a suburb of the city of Algiers in northern Algeria.

Suburbs of Algiers
Communes of Algiers Province
Cities in Algeria
Algeria